The Guthrie Theater, founded in 1963, is a center for theater performance, production, education, and professional training in Minneapolis, Minnesota. The concept of the theater was born in 1959 in a series of discussions between Sir Tyrone Guthrie, Oliver Rea and Peter Zeisler.  Disenchanted with Broadway, they intended to form a theater with a resident acting company, to perform classic plays in rotating repertory, while maintaining the highest professional standards.

The Guthrie Theater has performed in two main-stage facilities. The first building was designed by Ralph Rapson, included a 1,441-seat thrust stage designed by Tanya Moiseiwitsch, and was operated from 1963–2006. After closing its 2005–2006 season, the theater moved to its current facility designed by Jean Nouvel.

In 1982, the theater won the Regional Theatre Tony Award.

History
In 1959, Sir Tyrone Guthrie published a small invitation in the drama page of The New York Times soliciting communities' interest and involvement in a resident theater. Out of the seven cities that responded, the Twin Cities showed not only interest but also eagerness for the project.

Frank Whiting, the director of the University of Minnesota Theater, introduced Guthrie to the arts community in the Twin Cities and helped gather support that persuaded Guthrie to locate his theater in Minneapolis. With the help of the newly founded Tyrone Guthrie Theater Foundation a fundraising effort raised over US$2 million. The new theater was completed in 1963 in time for the May 7 opening of Hamlet. During its first season the Guthrie featured well known stage actors Hume Cronyn, Jessica Tandy and Zoe Caldwell and featured a group of younger actors including George Grizzard, Ellen Geer and Joan van Ark. Tyrone Guthrie served as Artistic Director until 1966 and continued to direct at the theater he founded until 1969, two years before his death. In 1966 Douglas Campbell was named Artistic Director.

Throughout the 1960s the Guthrie found critical acclaim in its productions of Henry V, St. Joan, Caucasian Chalk Circle, Three Sisters and The House of Atreus. In 1968 the production of The House of Atreus was taken on the road in a national tour that was a first for a resident theater.  Also starting in 1968, the Guthrie began a tradition of producing plays on smaller stages in the Twin Cities area, including the Crawford-Livingston Theater in St. Paul and The Other Place.

In 1971, Michael Langham became artistic director and produced classic plays including Oedipus Rex, Love's Labour's Lost, She Stoops to Conquer, and A Streetcar Named Desire. After Langham left in 1977, the Guthrie crossed a milestone of sorts when for the first time it selected an artistic director that was not a respected collaborator or friend of Tyrone Guthrie. That year Alvin Epstein was selected as artistic director and was the first American to fill that role.

In 1980 Liviu Ciulei replaced Epstein. Ciulei was the former artistic director of  Teatrul Bulandra in Romania and had a profound influence on the Guthrie. He challenged audiences with his bold theatrical interpretations and his highly contemporary and international style. Ciulei's interest in theater didn't stop at the productions themselves, he was a designer and architect and one of the first things he did was to redesign the theater itself. His changes allowed more structural flexibility in the stage to allow each production a unique physical presentation. While Ciulei was not able to attain all the goals he had envisioned, he was able to maintain and advance the Guthrie's national and international reputation as a first-rate example of American theater and drew critical success with productions of classics such as Peer Gynt, The Marriage of Figaro, A Midsummer Night's Dream, The Seagull, and Tartuffe. He also was able to reestablish the Guthrie’s commitment to acting ensembles by gathering together a rotating repertory in his last season as Artistic Director in 1985. In 1982 the theater won the Regional Theatre Tony Award.

That year the Guthrie turned to Garland Wright, who had spent some time as Liviu Ciulei’s associate artistic director in the early 1980s as Ciulei's replacement. Wright had shared a vision with Ciulei that included the desire to have a second, smaller stage that could act as a lab to enable the exploration of new work and performance techniques. Born out of this vision was the Guthrie Laboratory (also known as the Guthrie Lab) located in the Minneapolis Warehouse District. Wright also shared a desire to keep the concept of a resident acting company alive and used his ensembles to great effect. He was able to combine critical and popular success with a series of productions that helped reestablish a large, enthusiastic and loyal audience base. Productions from this period include The Misanthrope, Richard III, The Screens, and a trilogy of Richard II, Henry IV (Parts I and II) and Henry V, Medea and As You Like It. Wright also created a series of outreach programs designed to garner interest in theater among young people and involving high school and colleague instructors.

Garland Wright announced his resignation in 1994 and after an international search for his successor, Joe Dowling was chosen as the Guthrie's seventh artistic director.  Dowling had gained an international reputation with his work at Ireland's national theater, the Abbey Theatre, including becoming the Abbey's youngest artistic director in its long history.

Under Dowling's artistic leadership, the Guthrie enjoyed unprecedented growth. Subscriptions are at an all-time high of more than 32,000, up more than 50% from the beginning of Dowling's tenure. Dowling's time at the Guthrie Theater has been marked by a return to regional touring, co-productions by visiting international theater companies (WorldStage Series), collaborations with local theater companies, and his own dynamic productions of the classics.

Dowling retired in 2014. The eighth artistic director of the Guthrie is Joseph Haj, who took over in 2015.

Vineland Place

Paired with an innovative philosophy that included a resident acting company with high professional standards was a unique design concept in the stage itself.

Ralph Rapson was selected to design the 1963 theater building. Rapson was a leading contributor to architecture's modern movement on the East Coast from the late 1940s through the 1950s, and served as head of the University of Minnesota School of Architecture in the late 1950s.  Rapson had also worked on some preliminary sketches of the Walker Art Center, which donated land on Vineland Place for the Guthrie's construction. Guthrie and Rapson selected a modified theater in the round design that featured a thrust stage projecting from a back wall with seating surrounding nearly two thirds of it.

The Guthrie's design arose out of Ralph Rapson's work with the Walker Art Center, and concepts the Walker was considering for a small auditorium near their museum. The result was a theater designed by Rapson, that seated 1,441 people when it first opened its doors in 1963. Its irregularly-shaped stage, designed by Tanya Moiseiwitsch, had 7 sides and took up 1120 square feet (104 m²). Seating radiated outward and upward, and the ceiling was hung with acoustical panels that carried the asymmetrical theme to the top of the theater. The design concept encouraged the minimal use of large set pieces. In 1974 the distinctive exterior screen, which had suffered from corrosion by the elements over the years, was removed. In 1980, Artistic Director Liviu Ciulei redesigned the stage. The stage itself was modified so that its size, shape and height was adjustable, and he opened up the back wall to create more depth.

In 2002, the National Trust for Historic Preservation put the old Guthrie building on its list of the most endangered historic properties in the United States in response to plans announced by the Walker Art Center to expand on the land occupied by the theater. However, demolition started in late 2006 beginning with the common area between the old Guthrie building and the Walker. The site has been turned into green space and an extension of the Minneapolis Sculpture Garden.

On the river

In 2006, the Guthrie finished construction of a new $125 million theater building along the Mississippi River in downtown Minneapolis. The design is the work of Jean Nouvel, along with the Minneapolis architectural firm Architectural Alliance and is a  facility that houses three theaters: (1) the theater's signature thrust stage, seating 1,100, (2) a 700-seat proscenium stage, and (3) a black-box studio with flexible seating. It also has a 178-foot cantilevered bridge (called the "Endless Bridge") to the Mississippi which is open to visitors during normal building hours. The outside of the building's walls are covered in large panels which display a large mural of photographs from past plays visible clearly at night. Jean Nouvel was in association with dUCKS scéno and Jacques Le Marquet for the scenography of the theaters and the acousticians of The Talaske Group and Kahle Acoustics.

The first Guthrie production at the new location, The Great Gatsby (adapted for the stage by Simon Levy and directed by David Esbjornson), opened on July 15, 2006.

Auditoriums
 1,100-seat Wurtele Thrust Stage
 700-seat McGuire Proscenium Stage
 199-seat Dowling Studio

Dining and retail
 Sea Change, a seafood restaurant 
 Level Five Cafe, pre-show dining
 Level Five Express, coffee bar
 Guthrie Store

Public spaces
 The Endless Bridge
 Target Lounge
 Theater lobbies on levels 4, 5, and 9
 Street lobby on level 1

Semi-public spaces
 The Guthrie Learning Center - education classrooms
 Kitchak Lounge (donor lounge)

Alternate stages
Crawford Livingston Theater (1968–1969)
The Other Place (1968–1971)
Guthrie 2 (1976–1979)
Guthrie Lab (1988–2005)

Artistic directors
Tyrone Guthrie (1963–1966)
Douglas Campbell (1966–1967)
position not filled (1968–1970)
Michael Langham (1971–1977)
Alvin Epstein (1978–1980)
Liviu Ciulei (1980–1985)
Garland Wright (1986–1995)
Joe Dowling (1995–2015)
Joseph Haj (2015–present)

2021-2022 season

What the Constitution Means to Me – by Heidi Schreck
A Christmas Carol – by Charles Dickens, adapted by Lavina Jadhwani
A Raisin in the Sun – by Lorraine Hansberry
The Tempest – by William Shakespeare
Emma – by Kate Hamill, based on  the novel by Jane Austen
Sweat – by Lynn Nottage

See Guthrie Theater production history for previous seasons.

See also
 Gold Medal Park
 Tyrone Guthrie Centre, Ireland

References

Further: reading

Further: viewing

External links

Guthrie Theater web site
Photos of the new Guthrie
Building profile at arcspace.com
Guthrie Theater Archives finding aid

Arts organizations based in Minneapolis
Culture of Minneapolis
League of Resident Theatres
Tony Award winners
Theatre in Minneapolis
Jean Nouvel buildings
Regional theatre in the United States
Arts organizations established in 1963
1963 establishments in Minnesota